
A mompreneur is a female business owner who actively balances the roles of mother and of entrepreneur. The term was introduced in about 1994.

The term has a dedicated section on Entrepreneur magazine's website. There is also a Canadian magazine devoted to the topic, The MOMpreneur Magazine. A 2011 MSNBC article declared the rise of the mompreneur to be a hot topic in the small business sector.

Investopedia adds that "mompreneurs are a relatively new trend in entrepreneurship, and have come to increased prominence in the internet age, with the internet allowing entrepreneurs to sell products out of their homes" rather than relying on foot traffic to brick-and-mortar business.

A 2010 article in U.S. News & World Report tried to dispel the myths about the mompreneur movement, including the belief that an innovative product idea will lead to easy money.

Other examples of mompreneur coverage by major news outlets include the nationally syndicated weekly advice column "Ask the Mompreneur" published by The Charlotte Observer website, the city's largest daily publication.

Notable mompreneurs 

 Tina Brown
 Arianna Huffington
 J. K. Rowling
 Jin Sook Chang
 Diane von Fürstenberg
 Cher Wang
 Zhang Xin
 Julie Aigner-Clark
 Liz Lange
 Dame Stephanie Shirley

See also 

 Working Mother
 Work–life balance

Notes

References 
 
 

Entrepreneurship
Motherhood